The 2013–14 UNC Asheville Bulldogs men's basketball team represented the University of North Carolina at Asheville during the 2013–14 NCAA Division I men's basketball season. The Bulldogs, led by first year head coach Nick McDevitt, played their home games at Kimmel Arena and were members of the South Division of the Big South Conference. They finished the season 17–15, 10–6 in Big South play to finish in a three way tie for second place in the South Division. They advanced to the semifinals of the Big South Conference tournament where they lost to Winthrop.

Roster

Schedule

|-
!colspan=9 style="background:#00438C; color:#FFFFFF;"| Exhibition

|-
!colspan=9 style="background:#00438C; color:#FFFFFF;"| Regular season

|-
!colspan=9 style="background:#00438C; color:#FFFFFF;"| Big South tournament

References

UNC Asheville Bulldogs men's basketball seasons
UNC Asheville
Asheville
Asheville